Patty & the Emblems were an American pop group from Camden, New Jersey. The group was a one-hit wonder, scoring their only Top 40 hit in the U.S. and Canada with "Mixed Up, Shook Up Girl" in 1964.  Their follow-up was "I'm Confused."

The group continued recording singles until 1967, but never reached the same kind of success. Every member, except Patty Russell who left the industry, continued to have long-enduring music careers.

Chart history for "Mixed Up, Shook Up Girl"

Members
Patty Russell (died September 5, 1998)
Eddie Watts Sr. 
Vance Walker  (died February 1, 2008)
Alexander Wildes Sr. (died November 13, 1998)

References

Musical groups from New Jersey